Rajendra Prasad is a chest physician and professor of Pulmonary Medicine based in Lucknow.
He is an MBBS (1974) and MD (1979) from King George's Medical College which was then under University of Lucknow. After some time he joined same institution as faculty member and later became head of department of Pulmonary Medicine department of King George's Medical University. He also worked as director of U.P. Rural Institute of Medical Sciences and Research and Vallabhbhai Patel Chest Institute (University of Delhi). Now he is working as Director Medical Education and Professor & Head of Department, Pulmonary Medicine of Era University's ERA's Lucknow Medical College and also doing private practice at his clinic at Lucknow's Aliganj area.

Awards
 Dr. B. C. Roy Award by the Medical Council of India (2010)

References

Living people
Academic staff of Uttar Pradesh University of Medical Sciences
Academic staff of Delhi University
King George's Medical University alumni
University of Lucknow alumni
20th-century Indian medical doctors
Medical doctors from Uttar Pradesh
Dr. B. C. Roy Award winners
Year of birth missing (living people)